Beliamen is a village in Kurram Agency in north west Pakistan, not far from the border with Afghanistan.  The closest main town is Parachinar. The village has been home to many Afghan settlers as well as Bangash tribes.  It is situated at about 50 km from Parachinar the capital of Kurram.

Populated places in Kurram District